Daniel Duval (28 November 1944 – 10 October 2013) was a French film actor, director and writer. 

Best known as an actor, Duval has credits in over 70 television and film productions. As a filmmaker, Duval was awarded the Silver Prize at the 10th Moscow International Film Festival in 1977 for his drama film Shadow of the Castles, which he wrote and directed.  In 2008 and 2010, he appeared in a recurring role during the second and third seasons, respectively, of the hit French TV drama Engrenages.

He was briefly married to Anna Karina, from 1978 to 1981.

Selected filmography

 La ville bidon (1971) - Mario
 George Who? (1973) - Le soldat
 Le voyage d'Amélie (1974) - Dan
 Let Joy Reign Supreme (1975) - Le mirebalai
 L'agression (1975) - Un motard
 Ben et Bénédict (1977) - Rémi Peyrou
 Shadow of the Castles (1977)
 Va voir maman, papa travaille (1978) - Serge
 Le dernier amant romantique (1978) - Un candidat recalé
 Memoirs of a French Whore (1979) - Gérard aka "Gégé"
 The Story of a Mother (1979) - Døden
 Le bar du téléphone (1980) - Toni Véronèse
 L'amour trop fort (1981) - Charlie Maupas
 The Judge (1984) - Antoine Rocca
 Un été d'enfer (1984) - Commissaire Turielle
 Among Wolves (1985) - The Gitan
 Stan the Flasher (1990) - Le père de Natacha
 Nefertiti, figlia del sole (1995) - Monkutura
 Will It Snow for Christmas? (1996) - Le père
 Love, etc. (1996) - Yvon
 J'irai au paradis car l'enfer est ici (1997) - Bertrand Cardone
 Je ne vois pas ce qu'on me trouve (1997) - Marc Lelong
 Ça ne se refuse pas (1998) - Carbone
 Si je t'aime, prends garde à toi (1998) - Samuel
 Le vent de la nuit (1999) - Serge
 Le margouillat (2000) - L'avocat
 Total Khéops (2002) - Manu
 Gomez & Tavarès (2003) - Izenberg
 Time of the Wolf (2003) - Georges Laurent
 Process (2004) - L'amant
 À San Remo (2004) - Etienne
 Vendus (2004) - Pavel
 36 Quai des Orfèvres (2004) - Eddy Valence
 Caché (2005) - Pierre
 Time to Leave (2005) - Le père
 Le temps des porte-plumes (2006) - Le psychologue
 A City Is Beautiful at Night (2006) - Le flic
 Jean de la Fontaine, le défi (2007) - Terron
 Gomez vs. Tavarès (2007) - M. Eisenberg
 The Grocer's Son (2007) - Le père
 3 amis (2007) - Francis
 Le deuxième souffle (2007) - Venture Ricci
 Plus tard tu comprendras (2008) - Georges Gornick
 Les tremblements lointains (2008)
 District 13: Ultimatum (2009) - Walter Gassman
 How to Draw a Perfect Circle (2009) - Paul
 R.T.T. (2009) - Segal
 De vrais mensonges (2010) - Le père d'Émilie
 Beau rivage (2011) - Michel Matarasso
 Des vents contraires (2011) - Xavier, l'éditeur
 A Gang Story (2011) - Christo
 La vie pure (2014) - Tonton
 Kickback (2015) - Judge Martin (final film role)

References

External links

1944 births
2013 deaths
French film directors
People from Val-de-Marne
French male film actors
French male television actors
20th-century French male actors
21st-century French male actors
French male screenwriters
French screenwriters